was a Japanese daimyō of the early Edo period. He served in a variety of positions in the Tokugawa shogunate, including wakadoshiyori and Kyoto Shoshidai.

Naotsune did not formally rule a domain; however, as he was given income from various lands within Kawachi Province rated at 20,000 koku, he was counted as a daimyō. His son Nagai Naohiro also became a high-ranking shogunate official.

References
 Bolitho, Harold. (1974). Treasures Among Men: The Fudai Daimyo in Tokugawa Japan. New Haven: Yale University Press.  ;  OCLC 185685588

1631 births
1677 deaths
Daimyo
Kyoto Shoshidai
Wakadoshiyori
Japanese pages